{{Infobox artist
| name          = Peter Laurent de Francia
| image         =
| caption       =
| birth_name    =
| birth_date    = 
| birth_place   = Beaulieu-sur-Mer, Alpes Maritimes, France
| death_date    = 
| death_place   = London, UK
| nationality   = British
| known_for     = Painting, drawing
| notable_works ={{unbulleted list
  | The Execution of Beloyannis (1953)
  |  Portrait of Eric Hobsbawm (1955)
  | The Bombing of Sakiet (1959)
  | The Emigrants         (1964)
  | Ship of Fools (1985) 
  }}
| training      =
| movement      =
| patrons       =
| awards        = 
}}

Peter Laurent de Francia (25 January 1921 – 19 January 2012) was an Italian-British artist, who was Professor of Painting at the Royal College of Art (RCA), London, from 1972 to 1986. His paintings and drawing are included in art collections in Britain, and he was the author of two books on Fernand Léger, Leger: The Great Parade (Painters on Painting) (1969) and Fernand Léger (1983), and of several articles on art.

Influenced by nineteenth-century socialist painters such as Gustave Courbet and Honoré Daumier, as well as by socially committed artists of his time like Renato Guttuso and Pablo Picasso, de Francia used subjects that exposed the contradictions in everyday life to try to inspire change.

Biography
De Francia was born in Beaulieu-sur-Mer Alpes Maritimes, France to an Italian father, Laurent Fernand de Francia, and an English mother, Alice Groom. He grew up in Paris and was educated at Paris's American school, followed by studies in art at the Academy of Brussels (1938–40), and after settling in London, at the Slade School of Fine Art, University of London, in the years 1945-1948.

He worked at the Canadian Government Exhibition Commission in Ottawa (1949–1950) and in the Architects' Department of the American Museum in New York City (1950–1951). From 1953 to 1968, he was a tutor in the Department of Art History and Complementary Studies at St Martin's School of Art, London (1953–1968), and from 1963 to 1969 also tutored in the Department of Art History and Complementary Studies at the Royal College of Art (RCA). He was Principal of the Department of Fine Art, Goldsmiths' College, University of London (1969–72), and from 1972 to 1986 was Professor of Painting at the RCA.

He is buried on the eastern side of Highgate Cemetery.

Selected exhibitions
2012 - Peter de Francia. An Intimate View, James Hyman Gallery, London
2011 - Peter de Francia. Paintings: A 90th Birthday Retrospective, James Hyman Gallery, London
2009 - Peter de Francia. Art World Drawings, James Hyman Gallery, London
2008 - Modern Myths, New York Studio School (catalogue), New York
2007-08 - The Ship of Fools: Peter de Francia in Focus, Pallant House, Chichester
2006 - Peter de Francia, Tate Britain (brochure, interview by Philip Dodd), London
2005 - After the Bombing, James Hyman Gallery, London
2004 - Drawings, The Gallery, Wimbledon School of Art, London
2002 - Peter de Francia: Fables and Other Drawings: 1990-2001, Queen's Gallery, British Council, New Delhi, India
1999 - Peter de Francia: Drawings, Ruskin School, Oxford
Peter de Francia: Ballets Africains: Drawings, The Place, London
1996 - Peter de Francia: Drawings 1993-96, Austin/Desmond Fine Art, London 
1995 - Peter de Francia, Gloria Gallery, Nicosia, Cyprus
1991 - Peter de Francia, Centre for Contemporary Art, New Delhi, India
1987 - Peter de Francia: Paintings and drawings, Graves Art Gallery, Sheffield
1989 - Peter de Francia: Untitled, Frith Street Gallery, London
1990 - Peter de Francia, Pomeroy Purdy Gallery, London
1987 - Peter de Francia: Retrospective, Camden Arts Centre, London 
1983 - Peter de Francia, Forum Gallery, New York 
1980 - Peter de Francia, New Art Centre, London
1978 - Peter de Francia, Gallery of the Institute of Cultural Relations, Budapest, Hungary
1977 - Peter de Francia: Retrospective, Camden Arts Centre, London & New 57 Gallery, Edinburgh
1976 - Peter de Francia, New Art Centre, London
1969 - Peter de Francia, New 57 Gallery, Edinburgh
1962 - Peter de Francia, Forum Gallery, New York
1962 - Peter de Francia, Gallery of the Union of Czech Writers, Prague
1961 - Peter de Francia, Galerie d'Eendt, Amsterdam, The Netherlands
1959 - Peter de Francia, Colonna Gallery, Milan, Italy
1958 - Peter de Francia, Waddington Galleries, London (catalogue)
Peter de Francia, Colonna Gallery, Milan, Italy.

Selected publications
 Impressionism, Methuen & Co., 1956. 62 pp
 The Great Parade (Painters on Painting). Worthing: Little Hampton Book Services Ltd, 1969. 32 pp. .
 Fernand Léger, New Haven: Yale University Press, 1983. 288 pp. .
 Peter de Francia: Fables, Maruts Press, 2002. 
 Peter de Francia Portraits'', James Hyman Fine Art, 2006.

References

External links
Peter de Francia at James Hyman Fine Art
British Library Archives of an interview with Peter de Francia at the artist's home in London 2000-2001 
 Art UK - Peter de Francia
 Tate - Peter de Francia

1921 births
2012 deaths
Burials at Highgate Cemetery
English male painters
20th-century English painters 
People from Alpes-Maritimes
Artists from Paris
Academics of Goldsmiths, University of London
Academics of the Royal College of Art
Alumni of the Slade School of Fine Art
French emigrants to the United Kingdom
French expatriates in Belgium
British people of Italian descent
20th-century English male artists